The participation of Belgium in Eurovision Choir began in Riga, Latvia, at the Eurovision Choir of the Year 2017. Radio Télévision Belge de la Communauté Française (RTBF) a member organisation of the European Broadcasting Union (EBU) are responsible for the selection process of their participants, for their debut in 2017. The first representative to participate for the nation at the 2017 edition are Les Pastoureaux.

Origins of the event 
The Eurovision Choir of the Year is a new event being launched by the EBU, and the latest event to be launched since the Eurovision Magic Circus Show. The event will consist of non-professional choirs who are members of the EBU, with the inaugural contest scheduled to take place on 22 July 2017, hosted by the Latvian broadcaster Latvijas Televīzija (LTV), and to coincide with the closing ceremony of the European Choir Games 2017. The event will be officially confirmed on 30 November 2016 depending on a reasonable amount of interest from active members of the European Broadcasting Union.

History
On 27 February 2017, the Belgian national broadcaster, Radio Télévision Belge de la Communauté Française (RTBF), announced that they would be making their Choir of the Year debut at the 2017 edition in Riga, Latvia on 22 July 2017. RTBF revealed in an interview with Télépro that for future participation they would opt to use a national selection and allow the public to choose their representatives. The pre-selection shows would be organised in conjunction with Musiq'3 and La Trois.

Participation overview 
Table key

Broadcasts

Commentators
The contests are broadcast online worldwide through the official Eurovision Choir of the Year website eurovisionchoir.tv and YouTube. The Belgian broadcaster, RTBF, send their own commentator to each contest in order to provide commentary in the French language.

See also
Belgium in the Eurovision Song Contest – Senior version of the Junior Eurovision Song Contest.
Belgium in the Eurovision Young Dancers – A competition organised by the EBU for younger dancers aged between 16 and 21.
Belgium in the Eurovision Young Musicians – A competition organised by the EBU for musicians aged 18 years and younger.
Belgium in the Junior Eurovision Song Contest – Singing contest for children aged between 9 and 14.

References

External links
 

Belgium
Belgian music